Loch a' Chàirn Bhàin (Gaelic for "White Cairn Loch"), or Loch Cairnbawn, is a sea inlet off Eddrachillis Bay on the west coast of the Scottish Highlands north of Ullapool. It was the site of the World War Two midget submarine training base, Port HHZ.

References 

Chairn Bhain
Landforms of Sutherland
Chairn